Marco van der Stel (born 9 December 1991) is a Dutch triathlete. He competed in the mixed relay event at the 2020 Summer Olympics.

References

External links
 

1991 births
Living people
Dutch male triathletes
Olympic triathletes of the Netherlands
Triathletes at the 2020 Summer Olympics
Sportspeople from Rotterdam